The Treaties and Other International Acts Series (TIAS) are a series of pamphlets or slip treaties published by the United States Department of State under the authority of the United States Secretary of State.

They replaced the Treaty Series (TS or USTS), issued singly in pamphlets until 1945, and the Executive Agreement Series (EAS), issued singly in pamphlets until 1945.

See also 
 United States Treaties and Other International Agreements (UST)
 Treaty series

Collections of treaties
Treaties of the United States
United States Department of State publications